The men's K-1 1000 metres event was an individual kayaking event conducted as part of the Canoeing at the 1976 Summer Olympics program.

Medalists

Results

Heats
The 19 competitors first raced in three heats on July 29. The top three finishers from each of the heats advanced directly to the semifinals. All remaining competitors competed in the repechages later that day.

Perri and Diba were disqualified for underweight boats after their heats, but the decision was reversed when judges announced that the super sensitive electronic scales had responded to a change in atmospheric pressure.

Repechages
Taking place on July 29, three repechages were held. The top three finishers in each repechage advanced to the semifinals.

Semifinals
Raced on July 31, the top three finishers from each of the three semifinals advanced to the final.

Final
The final took place on July 31.

Helm, the youngest competitor of the event, was fifth at the 250 meter mark, then made his move at the last quarter of the race. Passing Csapó, he shouted for joy as he crossed the finish line in victory.

References
1976 Summer Olympics official report Volume 3. p. 180. 
Sports-reference.com 1976 K-1 1000 m results.
Wallechinsky, David and Jaime Loucky (2008). "Canoeing: Men's Kayak Singles 1000 Meters". In The Complete Book of the Olympics: 2008 Edition. London: Aurum Press Limited. p. 472.

Men's K-1 1000
Men's events at the 1976 Summer Olympics